Jiffy is a Thai chain of convenience stores. There are a total of 149 Jiffy convenience stores, mostly in petrol stations.

Companies
 Jiffy Convenience Store
 Jiffy Express
 Jiffy Kitchen
 Jiffy Bistro
 Jiffy Market
 Jiffy Daily
 Jiffy Super Fresh Market
 Jiffy Plus Supermarket

Revenue
Jiffy stores generate monthly revenue of 2.2 million baht each, while 7-Elevens generate 1.2 million baht each, due to their differing sizes.

References

Retail companies of Thailand
Convenience stores
PTT group